MKB may refer to:

Business 
 MKB Bank, the third-biggest commercial bank in Hungary
 MKB Raduga, a Russian aerospace company
 MKB Fakel, a Russian government-owned aerospace defense corporation

Community
Moogooru Karnataka Brahmin, a sect of Kannada speaking Smartha Brahmins and follow Advaita Vedanta
MKB Nagar, residential locality in northern part of the metropolitan city of Chennai, Tamil Nadu state, India
 MKB Veszprém, a handball club from Hungary
M. K. B. v. Warden, a sealed case in South Florida

People
Małgorzata Kidawa-Błońska
Marques Brownlee

Computing
Media Key Block